Farida Devi, also known as Farida Dadi or Baby Farida, is an Indian actress in Hindi-language films and television serials.

Career
She started her career as a child actor in films in the 60s and was the most sought-after child actress. She made her debut as the young Shashikala in the movie Sujata (1960), when she was eight years old. Her most remembered roles as a child artist were in Dosti, Ram Aur Shyam, Brahmachari, Sangam, Kabuliwalah, Jab Jab Phool Khile, Phool Aur Patthar and more with directors like Bimal Roy, Raj Kapoor, K Asif, Mehboob Khan and Guru Dutt.

Filmography
Her films include:

Television

Web series

References

External links
 
  as Farida Dadi (name post marriage)

Living people
Indian film actresses
Actresses in Hindi cinema
20th-century Indian actresses
21st-century Indian actresses
Actresses from Mumbai
Indian television actresses
Indian soap opera actresses
Actresses in Hindi television
Year of birth missing (living people)